Ann Nafi Aussi Balbol was the Iraqi Minister of Construction and Housing from 2016-2018. She is of Assyrian origin and was born on (September 23, 1964). She is currently running for the Iraqi parliament under the National Rafidain List.

Certificates
 Bachelor of Civil Engineering,  Baghdad University 1985-1986.
 Master of Science in Civil Engineering/Construction's Jurisdiction, University of Baghdad under a university matter No. 3004 on 02/16/2003 issued by the Ministry of Higher Education and Scientific Research at Baghdad University's Department of Graduate Studies.
 Doctor of Philosophy in Engineering/Civil Engineering/Construction's Jurisdiction, Baghdad University campus under it, adopted on No. / 3577 on 25/10/2009 issued by the Ministry of Higher Education and Scientific Research at Baghdad University's Department of Graduate Studies.

Work
Anne has designed bridges across Baghdad since the beginning of her career as in engineer in 1988. She has also contributed to parts of multi-story buildings throughout the capital.

References

1964 births
University of Baghdad
Government ministers of Iraq
Iraqi Christians
Living people
People from Baghdad
Iraqi engineers
Iraqi Assyrian politicians
Iraqi Assyrian people